Charles Koester may refer to:

 Bev Koester (Charles Beverley Koester, 1926–1998), Canadian naval officer, civil servant and Clerk of the Canadian House of Commons
 Charles Roman Koester (1915–1997), American bishop of the Catholic Church